This article is about the demographic features of the population of Italy, including population density, ethnicity, education level, health of the populace, economic status, religious affiliations and other aspects of the population.

At the beginning of 2022, Italy had an estimated population of 58,9 million. However, the distribution of the population is widely uneven; the most densely populated areas are the Po Valley (which contains about a third of the country's population) in northern Italy and the metropolitan areas of Rome and Naples in central and southern Italy, while other vast areas are very sparsely populated, like the plateaus of Basilicata, the Alps and Apennines highlands, and the island of Sardinia.

The population of the country almost doubled during the twentieth century, but the pattern of growth was extremely uneven due to large-scale internal migration from the rural South to the industrial cities of the North, a phenomenon which happened as a consequence of the Italian economic miracle of the 1950–1960s. In addition, after centuries of net emigration, from the 1980s Italy has experienced large-scale immigration for the first time in modern history. According to the Italian government, there were an estimated 5,234,000 foreign nationals resident in Italy on 1 January 2019.

High fertility and birth rates persisted until the 1970s, after which they started to dramatically decline, leading to rapid population aging. At the end of the first decade of the 21st century, one in five Italians was over 65 years old. Italy has experienced a short growth in birth rates. The total fertility rate had climbed temporary from an all-time low of 1.18 children per woman in 1995 to 1.46 in 2010. To drop again to 1.24 in 2020. Due to large scale migration in the 2000s the total population reached its peak in 2014. Since then (lower) migration could not offset a shrinking population size, mainly due to the low birthrate, but also due to aging, the rising mortality.

Since the revised 1984 Lateran Treaty agreement, Italy has no official religion. However, it recognizes the role the Catholic Church plays in Italian society. In 2017, 78% of the population identified as Catholic, 15% as non-believers or atheists, 2% as other Christians and 6% adhered to other religions.

Historical overview

1861 to early 20th century

From its unification in 1861 to the Italian economic miracle of the 1950s and 1960s, Italy has been a country of mass emigration. Between 1898 and 1914, the peak years of Italian diaspora, approximately 750,000 Italians emigrated each year. As a consequence, large numbers of people with full or significant Italian ancestry are found in Brazil (25 million), Argentina (20 million), US (17.8 million), France (5 million), Venezuela (2 million), Uruguay (1.5 million), Canada (1.4 million), and Australia (800,000). In addition, Italian communities once thrived in the former African colonies of Eritrea (nearly 100,000 at the beginning of World War II), Somalia and Libya (150,000 Italians settled in Libya, constituting about 18% of the total Libyan population).

After World War II 
After Tito's annexation of Istria, Kvarner, most of the Julian March as well as the Dalmatian city of Zara following the Treaty of Peace with Italy, 1947, up to 350,000 local ethnic Italians (Istrian Italians and Dalmatian Italians) left communist Yugoslavia (Istrian–Dalmatian exodus). Furthermore, all of Libya's Italians were expelled after Muammar Gaddafi's takeover in 1970.

As a result of the profound economic and social changes brought by rapid postwar economic growth, including low birth rates, an aging population and thus a shrinking workforce, by the 1970s emigration had all but stopped and Italy started to have a positive net migration rate. The nation's immigrant population reached 5 million by 2015, making up some 8% of the total population. However, the long-lasting effects of the Eurozone crisis double-dip recession strongly slowed down immigration rates in Italy in the 2010s.

Effects of the COVID-19 pandemic 

As a direct effect of the COVID-19 pandemic, Italy registered at least 100,000 excess deaths for 2020 only, a loss of about 1.4 years in the average life expectancy, a noticeable decrease in births rates and a marked decrease in immigration rates, the overall effect being a record natural population decline of 342,042 units in that year, the largest ever recorded since 1918 (at the time of World War I).

Population 

Demographic statistics according to the World Population Review in 2022.
One birth every 6 minutes
One death every 4 minutes
Net loss of one person every 16 minutes
One net migrant every 45 minutes

Life expectancy 

Sources: Our World In Data and the United Nations.
1871–1950

1950–2020

Source: UN World Population Prospects

Fertility
Newborns, in 2021, fell to 400,249 with a decrease of -25% compared to 2011, and if the phenomenon is not reversed, GDP growth and the social security sector will have a bad outcome. The reasons that Italian citizens say for not having children are economic costs, fear of losing job and lack of services for families, but these problems have ceased to exist in other countries such as Sweden or France and these Europeans continue to have children below the population replacement level which is 2.1.

Historical fertility rates

The total fertility rate is the number of children born per woman. It is based on fairly good data for the entire period. Sources: Our World in Data and Gapminder Foundation.

In 2021 this was 1.47 children born/woman.

Mother's mean age at first birth; 31.1 years (2017 est.)

Age structure 

0-14 years: 0–14 years: 13.45% (male 4,292,431/female 4,097,732)
15-24 years: 9.61% (male 3,005,402/female 2,989,764)
25-54 years: 40.86% (male 12,577,764/female 12,921,614)
55-64 years: 14% (male 4,243,735/female 4,493,581)
65 years and over: 22.08% (male 5,949,560/female 7,831,076) (2020 est.

Median age

total: 46.5 years. Country comparison to the world: 5th
male: 45.4 years
female: 47.5 years (2020 est.)

Cities 

70.4% of Italian population is classified as urban, a relatively low figure among developed countries. Italy's administrative boundaries have seen significant devolution in recent decades; the metropolitan area was created as a new administrative unit, and major cities and metro areas now have a provincial status.

According to OECD, the largest conurbations are:
 Milan – 7.4 million
 Rome – 3.7 million
 Naples – 3.1 million
 Turin – 2.2 million
Urbanization

urban population: 71% of total population (2020)
rate of urbanization: 0.29% annual rate of change (2015–20 est.)

Vital statistics 

In the year 2020 88,345 babies were born to at least one foreign parent which makes up 21.8% of all newborns in that year (21,024 or 5.2% were born to foreign mothers, 7,529 or 1.9% to foreign fathers and 59,792 or 14.8% to two foreign parents.

Current vital statistics

Health
Obesity – adult prevalence rate

 19.9% (2016) Country comparison to the world: 108

Employment and income 
Unemployment, youth ages 15–24:
total: 32.2%. Country comparison to the world: 26th
male: 30.4%
female: 34.8% (2018 est.)

Immigration 

Since the fall of the Berlin Wall in 1989, and more recently, the 2004 and 2007 enlargements of the European Union, Italy received growing flows of migrants from the former socialist countries of Eastern Europe (especially Romania, Albania, Ukraine and Poland). The second most important area of immigration to Italy has always been the neighboring North Africa (especially Morocco, Egypt, Tunisia and Algeria). Furthermore, in recent years, growing migration fluxes from the Far East (notably, China and the Philippines) and Latin America (Ecuador, Peru) have been recorded.

Italy does not collect data on ethnicity or race of the country, but does collect data on nationality of its residents.

In 2020, Istat estimated that 5,039,637 foreign citizens lived in Italy, representing about 8.4% of the total population. These figures do not include naturalized foreign-born residents (121,457 foreigners acquired Italian citizenship in 2021) as well as illegal immigrants, the so-called clandestini, whose numbers, difficult to determine, are thought to be at least 670,000. Romanians made up the largest community in the country (1,145,718; around 10% of them being ethnic Romani people), followed by Albanians (441,027) and Moroccans (422,980).

The fourth largest, but the fastest growing, community of foreign residents in Italy was represented by the Chinese. The majority of Chinese living in Italy are from the city of Wenzhou in the province of Zhejiang. Breaking down the foreign-born population by continent, in 2020 the figures were as follows: Europe (54%), Africa (22%), Asia (16%), the Americas (8%) and Oceania (0.06%). The distribution of immigrants is largely uneven in Italy: 83% of immigrants live in the northern and central parts of the country (the most economically developed areas), while only 17% live in the southern half of the peninsula.

Net migration rate

 3.21 migrant(s)/1,000 population (2021 est.) Country comparison to the world: 34th

There are, as of 2022, 5,030,716 Foreign-born residents, accounting for 10.6% of the total population.

Their distribution by country of origin was as follows:

Languages 

Italy's official language is Italian; Ethnologue has estimated that there are about 55 million speakers of Italian in the country and a further 6.7 million outside of it, primarily in the neighboring countries and in the Italian diaspora worldwide. Italian, adopted by the central state after the unification of Italy, is a language based on the Florentine variety of Tuscan and is somewhat intermediate between the Italo-Dalmatian languages and the Gallo-Romance languages. Its development was also influenced by the Germanic languages of the post-Roman invaders. When Italy unified in 1861, only 3% of the population spoke Italian, even though an estimated 90% of Italians speak Italian as their L1 nowadays.

Italy is in fact one of the most linguistically diverse countries in Europe, as there are not only varieties of Italian specific to each cultural region, but also distinct regional and minority languages. The establishment of the national education system has led to the emergence of the former and a decrease in the use of the latter. The spread of Italian was further expanded in the 1950s and 1960s, because of the economic growth and the rise of mass media and television, with the state broadcaster (RAI) setting a colloquial variety of Italian to which the population would be exposed.

As a way to distance itself from the Italianization policies promoted because of nationalism, Italy recognized twelve languages as the Country's "historical linguistic minorities", which are promoted alongside Italian in their respective territories. French is co-official in the Aosta Valley as the province's prestige variety, under which the more commonly spoken Franco-Provencal dialects have been historically roofed. German has the same status in the province of South Tyrol as, in some parts of that province and in parts of the neighbouring Trentino, does Ladin. Slovene and Friulian are officially recognised in the provinces of Trieste, Gorizia and Udine in Venezia Giulia. In Sardinia, the Sardinian language has been the language traditionally spoken and is often regarded by linguists as constituting its own branch of Romance; in the 1990s, Sardinian has been recognized as "having equal dignity" with Italian, the introduction of which to the island officially started under the rule of the House of Savoy in the 18th century.

In these regions, official documents are either bilingual (trilingual in Ladin communities) in the co-official language(s) by default, or available as such upon request. Traffic signs are also multilingual, except in the Valle d’Aosta where French toponyms are generally used, with the exception of Aosta itself, which has retained its Latin form in Italian as well as English. Attempts to Italianize them, especially during the Fascist period, have been formally abandoned. Education is possible in minority languages where such schools are operating.

UNESCO and other authorities recognize a number of other languages which are not legally protected by Italian government: Piedmontese, Venetian, Ligurian, Lombard, Emilian-Romagnolo, Neapolitan and Sicilian.

Religion 

Roman Catholicism is by far the largest religion in the country, although the Catholic Church is no longer officially the state religion. In 2006, 87.8% of Italy's population self-identified as Roman Catholic, although only about one-third of these described themselves as active members (36.8%). In 2016, 71.1% of Italian citizens self-identified as Roman Catholic. This increased again to 78% in 2018.

Most Italians believe in God, or a form of a spiritual life force. According to a Eurobarometer Poll in 2005: 74% of Italian citizens responded that 'they believe there is a God', 16% answered that 'they believe there is some sort of spirit or life force' and 6% answered that 'they do not believe there is any sort of spirit, God, or life force'. There are no data collected through census.

Christianity
The Italian Catholic Church is part of the global Roman Catholic Church, under the leadership of the Pope, curia in Rome, and the Conference of Italian Bishops. In addition to Italy, two other sovereign nations are included in Italian-based dioceses, San Marino and Vatican City. There are 225 dioceses in the Italian Catholic Church, see further in this article and in the article List of the Roman Catholic dioceses in Italy. Even though by law Vatican City is not part of Italy, it is in Rome, and along with Latin, Italian is the most spoken and second language of the Roman Curia.

Italy has a rich Catholic culture, especially as numerous Catholic saints, martyrs and popes were Italian themselves. Roman Catholic art in Italy especially flourished during the Middle Ages, Renaissance and Baroque periods, with numerous Italian artists, such as Michelangelo, Leonardo da Vinci, Raphael, Caravaggio, Fra Angelico, Gian Lorenzo Bernini, Sandro Botticelli, Tintoretto, Titian and Giotto. Roman Catholic architecture in Italy is equally as rich and impressive, with churches, basilicas and cathedrals such as St Peter's Basilica, Florence Cathedral and St Mark's Basilica. Roman Catholicism is the largest religion and denomination in Italy, with around 71.1% of Italians considering themselves Catholic. Italy is also home to the greatest number of cardinals in the world, and is the country with the greatest number of Roman Catholic churches per capita.

Even though the main Christian denomination in Italy is Roman Catholicism, there are some minorities of Protestant, Waldensian, Eastern Orthodox and other Christian churches.

Immigration from Western, Central, and Eastern Africa at the beginning of the 21st century has increased the size of Baptist, Anglican, Pentecostal and Evangelical communities in Italy, while immigration from Eastern Europe has produced large Eastern Orthodox communities.

In 2006, Protestants made up 2.1% of Italy's population, and members of Eastern Orthodox churches comprised 1.2% or more than 700,000 Eastern Orthodox Christians including 180,000 Greek Orthodox, 550,000 Pentecostals and Evangelists (0.8%), of whom 400,000 are members of the Assemblies of God, about 250,000 are Jehovah's Witnesses (0.4%), 30,000 Waldensians, 25,000 Seventh-day Adventists, 22,000 Mormons, 15,000 Baptists (plus some 5,000 Free Baptists), 7,000 Lutherans, 4,000 Methodists (affiliated with the Waldensian Church).

Other religions
The longest-established religious faith in Italy is Judaism, Jews having been present in Ancient Rome before the birth of Christ. Italy has seen many influential Italian-Jews, such as prime minister Luigi Luzzatti, who took office in 1910, Ernesto Nathan served as mayor of Rome from 1907 to 1913 and Shabbethai Donnolo (died 982). During the Holocaust, Italy took in many Jewish refugees from Nazi Germany. However, with the creation of the Nazi-backed puppet Italian Social Republic, about 15% of 48,000 Italian Jews were killed. This, together with the emigration that preceded and followed the Second World War, has left only a small community of around 45,000 Jews in Italy today.

Due to immigration from around the world, there has been an increase in non-Christian religions. As of 2009, there were 1.0 million Muslims in Italy forming 1.6 percent of population; independent estimates put the Islamic population in Italy anywhere from 0.8 million to 1.5 million. Only 50,000 Italian Muslims hold Italian citizenship.

There are more than 200,000 followers of faith originating in the Indian subcontinent, including some 70,000 Sikhs with 22 gurdwaras across the country, 70,000 Hindus, and 50,000 Buddhists. There are an estimated some 4,900 Bahá'ís in Italy in 2005.

Education 
Literacy

 definition: age 15 and over can read and write
total population: 99.2%
male: 99.4%
female: 99% (2018 est.)
School life expectancy (primary to tertiary education)

total: 16 years
male: 16 years
female: 17 years (2018)

Genetics and ethnic groups

The genetic history of Italy is greatly influenced by geography and history. The ancestors of Italians are mostly Indo-European speakers (Italic peoples such as Latins,  Umbrians, Samnites, Oscans, Sicels and Adriatic Veneti, as well as Celts, Iapygians and Greeks) and pre-Indo-European speakers (Etruscans, Ligures, Rhaetians and Camunni in mainland Italy, Sicani and Elymians in Sicily and the Nuragic people in Sardinia). During the imperial period of Ancient Rome, the city of Rome was also home to people from various regions throughout the Mediterranean basin, including Southern Europe, North Africa and the Middle East. Based on DNA analysis, there is evidence of ancient regional genetic substructure and continuity within modern Italy dating to the pre-Roman and Roman periods.

Within the Italian population, there is enough cultural, linguistic, genetic and historical diversity for them to constitute several distinct groups throughout the peninsula. In this regard, peoples like the Friulians, the Ladins, the Sardinians and the South Tyroleans, who also happen to constitute recognized linguistic minorities, or even the Sicilians who are not, are cases in point, attesting to such internal diversity.

See also

 List of Italians
 Italian diaspora
Italian Americans
 Italian Brazilians
 Italian Argentines
Italian Venezuelans
 Romani people in Italy

Footnotes

References

External links

 Demographic page 
 Demographic Profile Italy Allianz Knowledge